Jalan Jengka 4, Federal Route 1543' is a main federal road in Bandar Pusat Jengka, Pahang, Malaysia.

At most sections, the Federal Route 1543 was built under the JKR R5 road standard, allowing maximum speed limit of up to 90 km/h.

List of junctions

Malaysian Federal Roads